Koper is a 2006 Indonesian film directed by Richard Oh, and starring Anjasmara, Maya Hasan, and Djenar Maesa Ayu.

Plot

Yahya (Anjasmara), a working-class clerk employed in a government-run archives office, finds a suitcase on a roadside that is purported to contain stolen cash from a bank. Soon after finding the suitcase, Yahya's life changes drastically, starting from the fact that everybody is competing to take advantage of him and his newly established status as a 'wealthy man'. However, Yahya decides to safeguard the suitcase and leave it unopened, until a few incidents force him to re-think that decision.

Cast
Anjasmara
Maya Hasan
Djenar Maesa Ayu
Djaduk Ferianto
Virnie Ismail
Arie Daginkz
Enrico Soekarno
Zen Hae
Erry Isfandiari
Eka Kurniawan
Moammar Emka
Barry Prima
Niniek L. Karim
Restu Sinaga
Aristides Katopo
Joko Anwar
Ferry Salim
Vebrianto Putra
Albertien Endah
Hendrik Carolus Warella
Butet Kertaradjasa
Indra Herlambang

Festivals
Koper was screened in the ASEAN competition at the 2007 Bangkok International Film Festival, Lyon Asian Film Festival 2007, in competition, Singapore International Film Festival 2007, Official Selection.

External links
  Official Site @ kopermovie.com
 

2006 films
2006 drama films
Indonesian drama films
2000s Indonesian-language films
Films shot in Indonesia